Odontostomias is a genus of barbeled dragonfishes.

Species
There are currently two recognized species in this genus:
 Odontostomias masticopogon Norman, 1930
 Odontostomias micropogon Norman, 1930

References

Stomiidae
Marine fish genera
Ray-finned fish genera
Taxa named by John Roxborough Norman